The Gibraltar Constitution Order 1969 was published on 30 May 1969 as an Order in Council.

The constitution was the outcome of the Constitutional Conference chaired by Malcolm Shepherd, 2nd Baron Shepherd which lasted from 16 July to 24 July 1968. The Gibraltarian members of the Constitutional Conference were: Joshua Hassan, Aurelio Montegriffo and Abraham Serfaty for the Association for the Advancement of Civil Rights; Robert Peliza, Maurice Xiberras and legal advisor Sir Frederick Bennet for the Integration With Britain Party; and Peter Isola.

Development
The move towards the 1969 Constitution was sparked off after the outcome of the 1967 sovereignty referendum, where 99.19% of Gibraltarians voted against passing under Spanish sovereignty and in favour of retaining their link with Britain, with democratic local institutions and with Britain retaining its present responsibilities.

Preamble

The crucial feature of the 1969 constitution for the Gibraltarians was the preamble to the Order in Council promulgating the Constitution, in its final form began:

This preamble has been called the "single most significant statement made on the sovereignty of Gibraltar since the signing of the Treaty of Utrecht".

Frontier closure

Upon the request of the United Nations, Spain and the United Kingdom had been developing inconclusive talks about Gibraltar for the previous three years. Since 1954, the Government of Spain under the leadership of Francisco Franco had been applying increasingly restrictive measures in its relationships with Gibraltar. On 24 July 1968, it complained to the UN Secretary General claiming that the constitutional talks were a "further obstacle to the solution of Gibraltar's future", a statement that was rejected by the Government of the United Kingdom. Shortly thereafter the frontier was closed by the Spanish Guardia Civil and chaos ensued as controls were implemented on travellers trying to use the ferry service at the port of Algeciras. This situation (which lasted into September 1968) was a precursor to the frontier closure implemented the following year.

The Constitution was published on 30 May 1969 and came into immediate effect. Elections were scheduled for 30 July. The Spanish government described the promulgation as an open disregard by the UK government of the UN Resolutions and a violation of the Treaty of Utrecht. On 6 July 1969, the decision to close the land border between Spain and Gibraltar was taken. Next day the decision was implemented.

The closing of the border, together with various other restrictions, was a severe shock for the Gibraltarians, who became aware that across the frontier there was a hostile and threatening foreign power. The closure of the frontier would last thirteen years and was considered by the Gibraltarians as the last in a series of sieges held by Spain to attempt to secure the surrender of the town.

See also
 Constitution of Gibraltar
 Gibraltar Constitution Order 2006
 1967 Gibraltar sovereignty referendum

Sources

References

External links
Gibraltar Constitution Order 1969

Constitutions of country subdivisions
Politics of Gibraltar
1969 in British law
1969 in Gibraltar
1969 in international relations
Defunct constitutions
Orders in Council